Autopilot is the fourth studio album by Boulder, Colorado band The Samples, released in 1994.

Production
The album was recorded in Boulder, and mixed, in part, at Pinnacle Studios, in Orem, Utah.

Critical reception
Trouser Press wrote that "even four albums on, there’s still that Sting/Police thing: 'Dinosaur Bones' could have appeared on Synchronicity, while 'As Tears Fall' sounds like a slowed-down version of 'If You Love Somebody Set Them Free.'"

Track listing
All songs written by Sean Kelly, except where noted.
 "As Tears Fall"
 "Madmen" 
 "Weight Of The World" 
 "Water Rush" (Jeep MacNichol)
 "Only To You" (Andy Sheldon)
 "Seasons In The City" (Kelly, Al Laughlin)
 "The Hunt" (Andy Sheldon)
 "Finest Role" 
 "Who Am I?"
 "Dinosaur Bones" 
 "Buffalo Herds & Windmills"

Lineup
 Sean Kelly (Lead Singer, Acoustic/Electric Guitars)
 Andy Sheldon (Bass, Vocals)
 Al Laughlin (Keyboards)
 Jeep MacNichol (Drums, Drum Machine, Percussion)
 Boyd Tinsley (Violin)

References

1994 albums
The Samples albums